Conan Unchained! is a 1984 adventure module for the Dungeons & Dragons roleplaying game that centers on an adventure of the fictional hero Conan the Barbarian and his companions.

Plot summary
Conan Unchained! is a scenario set during Conan's days as a Kozak raider and pirate on the Sea of Vilayet. The module includes rules for playing in the Hyborian Age with AD&D rules and provides character descriptions of Conan, Valeria, Juma, and Nestor from the Conan novels. Some of the scenes include being captured by Kozaks and traveling to a mysterious Island to rescue Princess Amrastisi.

Publication history
CB1 Conan Unchained! was written by David Cook, with art by Jeff Butler, and was published by TSR in 1984 as a 32-page booklet with an outer folder.   Its TSR product code is TSR 9123.

Reception
Steve Hampshire gave the module a mixed review in Imagine magazine. Hampshire felt that the module did have "some uniquely 'Conan' features", such as an almost total absence of normal AD&D monsters, which were replaced by humans. Although he thought the plot was "simple and derivative", Hampshire noted that the module provided some interesting settings and encounters. Hampshire stated that the module played well in general despite some minor glitches, and felt the module would be good for introducing players to the Conan universe, but added that further installments in the series would need stronger plot lines.

Rick Swan reviewed the adventure in The Space Gamer No. 73. Swan felt that designer David Cook gave a good shot at what he thought was "a pretty cheesy assignment" by adding new rules such as a Fear Factor for monsters to inspire terror, Luck Points to allow player characters to perform heroic feats, and a healing rule to mend wounded characters faster. Swan felt Cook had approached the Conan universe with respect although it "isn't a particularly good choice for the D&D system" due to its more grounded world building and lack of magic.  Swan concluded by saying that "Conan and D&D go together like peanut butter and tuna fish—it can be done, but you can bet there's going to be a funny taste."

Credits
David Cook: Design
Anne Gray: Editing
Elizabeth Riedel: Graphic design
Kitty Thompson: Graphic design
Jeff Butler: Interior art

See also
 List of Dungeons & Dragons modules
 Conan Against Darkness!
 GURPS Conan
 Conan Role-Playing Game
 Conan: The Roleplaying Game

References

External links
The "CB" modules from The Acaeum

Dungeons & Dragons modules
Role-playing game supplements introduced in 1984
Role-playing games based on Conan the Barbarian